The Ubatuba River is a river of Ceará state in eastern Brazil.

The river delta is protected by the  Delta do Parnaíba Environmental Protection Area, created in 1996.

See also
List of rivers of Ceará

References

Brazilian Ministry of Transport

Rivers of Ceará